Kyle Veris (born March 15, 1983 in Washington, D.C.) is an American soccer player.

Career

Youth and College
Veris grew up in Strongsville, Ohio, and learned to play soccer in the Lake Erie Youth Premier Soccer League. He began his career as playing club soccer for Ohio Premier, winning many league championships and accolades. He ended his career in the LEYPSL playing with Cleveland United, another powerhouse team where he flourished under the Serbian coach, Joe Raduka and Josepphi Pavlek.

Veris played high school soccer at Strongsville High School, and played college soccer at Akron for two years as a center forward before transferring to Ohio State in 2003. At Ohio State, he switched to central defense after redshirting the 2003 season and was named all-Big Ten Conference as a defender in 2004 and 2005.

He also played extensively in the USL Premier Development League, having spells with Michigan Bucks, Toledo Slayers and Columbus Shooting Stars.

Professional
Veris was drafted in the third round (25th overall) of the 2006 MLS SuperDraft by Los Angeles Galaxy. Over the course of the season, he started 10 games for the Galaxy, but never pinned down a consistent first team spot, and was waived at the end of 2007.

After a one-year stint at Hødd in Norway, Veris signed with the Puerto Rico Islanders for the 2009 season. In February 2010 Veris signed with Miami FC.

Veris signed with Pittsburgh Riverhounds of the USL Pro league on March 29, 2011.

References

External links
 Puerto Rico Islanders bio
 MLS player profile

1983 births
Living people
African-American soccer players
Akron Zips men's soccer players
American expatriate sportspeople in Norway
American expatriate soccer players
American soccer players
Association football defenders
Columbus Shooting Stars players
Expatriate footballers in Norway
IL Hødd players
LA Galaxy draft picks
LA Galaxy players
Major League Soccer players
Miami FC (2006) players
Flint City Bucks players
Ohio State Buckeyes men's soccer players
People from Strongsville, Ohio
Pittsburgh Riverhounds SC players
Puerto Rico Islanders players
Soccer players from Ohio
Soccer players from Washington, D.C.
Toledo Slayers players
USL Championship players
USL First Division players
USL League Two players
USSF Division 2 Professional League players
21st-century African-American sportspeople
20th-century African-American people